The fringed-lipped peninsula carp (Labeo fimbriatus) is a cyprinid fish in genus Labeo from Pakistan, India, Nepal, Bangladesh and Myanmar. It is listed as Least Concern in the global IUCN Red List of threatened species.

References 

Labeo
Fish described in 1795